Madeline Pumariega is the fifth president of Miami Dade College in Miami, Florida. She is the first female to hold the post.

Biography 
Pumariega attended Hialeah High School in Hialeah, Florida. She attended Miami Dade College and University of Central Florida as an undergraduate and received a bachelor's degree from St. Thomas University.

Pumariega began her career at Miami Dade College in 1992 as the Dean of Students Services and later was Dean of Student and Administration Services. In 2011 Pumariega became President of MDC's Wolfson Campus in downtown Miami and held the position for nearly two years. In 2013, Pumariega became the President and Chief Executive Officer of Take Stock in Children, a non-profit. 

In 2015, Florida Department of Education Commissioner Pam Stewart announced the appointment of Pumariega as Chancellor of the Florida College System. She was the first woman and first Hispanic FCS Chancellor.

In 2019, Pumariega was named executive vice president and provost of Tallahassee Community College. She also served as Affiliate Professor of Leadership at the NYU Steinhardt School of Culture, Education, and Human Development.

On November 17, 2020, Pumariega was appointed the fifth president of Miami Dade College.

References 

Year of birth missing (living people)
Living people
Heads of universities and colleges in the United States
Florida College System
Miami Dade College alumni
St. Thomas University (Florida) alumni
Florida Atlantic University alumni